Arndt Simon (born 14 January 1940) is a German inorganic chemist. He was a director at the Max Planck Institute for Solid State Research in Stuttgart.

Life 
Simon studied Chemistry at the University of Münster from 1960-1964. He worked on his doctoral thesis in the group of Harald Schäfer from 1964-1966 and finished his habilitation in 1971. In 1972, he was appointed as an associate professor at the University of Münster. Starting in 1974, he was a member of the Max-Planck Society and one of the directors at the Max Planck Institute for Solid State Research in Stuttgart. Since 1975, he was a honorary professor at the University of Stuttgart. Since 2010, he has been an emeritus.

Research 
Simon worked on a wide range of topics in inorganic chemistry:

 Alkali Metal Suboxides
 Subnitrides of Alkaline Earth Metals
 Metal-rich Halides and Oxides of Heavy d-Metals
 Condensed Clusters
 Interstitial Atoms in Metal Clusters
 Metalrich Binary and Ternary Halides of Lanthanides
 Thorium Cluster Compounds
 Intermetallic Compounds (Pauling-Simon Rule)
 Structures and Phase Transitions in Molecular Crystals
 Structure Property Relations (Photo Cathodes, Amorphous Metals, Magnetic Order and Frustration, Spin Crossover, Spin Glasses)
 Superconductivity
 Apparatus Development (Guinier-Simon Camera, Area Detector Diffractometer)

Awards 
Simon was awarded a number of awards and honorary doctorates: 

 1972 Chemistry Award of the Göttingen Academy of Sciences and Humanities
 1985 Wilhelm Klemm Award of the Society of German Chemists
 1987 Otto Bayer Award
 1990 Gottfried Wilhelm Leibniz Prize 
 1998 Dr. rer.nat. h.c. of Technical University Dresden
 1998 Dr. rer.nat. h.c. of University (TH) Karlsruhe
 1998 Centenary Prize, Royal Society of Chemistry
 2001 Dr. phil. h.c. of Stockholm University
 2002 Dr. h.c. of Université de Rennes I
 2004 Sir Nevill Mott Lecture, University of Loughborough
 2004 Liebig-Denkmünze of the Society of German Chemists
 2011 Terrae Rarae Award

He is also a member of several academies of sciences:

 1989 Member of the Academy of Sciences and Literature Mainz (Corresponding Member since 1994)
 1990 Member of the Heidelberg Academy of Sciences and Humanities
 1990 Member of the Academia Europaea
 1992 Member of  the Russian Academy of Sciences
 1998 Member of the Academy of Sciences Leopoldina
 1998 Foreign Member of the French Academy of Sciences
 2003 Honorary Fellow of the Chemical Research Society of India

References

1940 births
Living people
21st-century German chemists
20th-century German chemists
Solid state chemists
University of Münster alumni
Max Planck Institutes researchers
Max Planck Institute directors